Pál Pók (27 June 1929 – 11 September 1982) was a Hungarian water polo player. He competed in the men's tournament at the 1948 Summer Olympics, winning a silver medal.

References

1929 births
1982 deaths
Hungarian male water polo players
Olympic water polo players of Hungary
Water polo players at the 1948 Summer Olympics
Olympic silver medalists for Hungary
Olympic medalists in water polo
Medalists at the 1948 Summer Olympics
Sportspeople from Eger
20th-century Hungarian people